The Suicide Forecast (lit. "Suspicious Customers") is a 2011 South Korean comedy-drama film. It is Jo Jin-mo's directorial debut.

Plot
Baseball player-turned-insurance salesman Byung-woo (Ryoo Seung-bum) is seen as the cocky ace of his company until one of his clients commits suicide. The police suspect him of aiding and abetting the suicide, which almost jeopardizes Byung-woo's career. Anxious to ensure it won't happen again, he gets in touch with his previous clients. Particularly those who seem the type to commit suicide.

During his quest to turn their lives around for the better, Byung-woo reunites with a lonely husband (Park Chul-min), a debt-ridden lounge singer (Younha), a homeless young man (Im Joo-hwan), and a widowed mother (Jung Sun-kyung).

Cast
Ryoo Seung-bum ... Bae Byung-woo 
Seo Ji-hye ... Lee Hye-in
Sung Dong-il ... Manager Park Jin-seok
Park Chul-min ... Oh Sang-yeol
Jung Sun-kyung ... Choi Bok-soon
Im Joo-hwan ... Kim Young-tak
Younha ... Ahn So-yeon
Chae Bin ... Jin-hee
Lee Ji-eun ... Seon-hee
Lee Joon-ha ... Mi-hee
Oh Eun-chan ... Ok-dong
Sungha Jung ... Ahn Hyeok
Hong So-hee ... Kim Young-mi
Kim Byeong-chun ... Homeless guy Park
Choi Il-hwa ... Hwang Woo-cheol

References

External links
  
 The Suicide Forecast at Naver 
 
 
 

South Korean comedy-drama films
2011 comedy-drama films
2011 films
Films about suicide
2010s South Korean films